Neoplecostomus espiritosantensis is a species of armored catfish endemic to Brazil where it is found on the eastern slope of the Serra do Mar in the Jacu and São Lourenço Rivers.  This species grows to a length of  SL.

References
 

espiritosantensis
Fish of South America
Fish of Brazil
Endemic fauna of Brazil
Taxa named by Francisco Langeani-Neto
Fish described in 1990